This is a list of soul musicians who have either been influential within the genre, or have had a considerable amount of fame. Bands are listed by the first letter in their name (not including the words "a", "an", or "the"), and individuals are listed by last name.



0–9
The "5" Royales
The 5th Dimension

A
Aaliyah
Adele
Anderson Paak
Aretha Franklin
Arthur Alexander
Aṣa
Ashford & Simpson
Atlantic Starr
Aurea
Ayọ
Barbara Acklin
Christina Aguilera
India.Arie
Jhené Aiko
Johnny Ace
Johnny Adams
Melanie Amaro
Patti Austin
Shola Ama
Sunshine Anderson

B
Baby Huey & the Babysitters
Chimène Badi
Erykah Badu
Corinne Bailey Rae
Anita Baker
LaVern Baker
Hank Ballard
Ben l'Oncle Soul
Bessie Banks
Darrell Banks
The Bar-Kays
J. J. Barnes
Fontella Bass
Bee Gees
Archie Bell and the Drells
William Bell
Regina Belle
Brook Benton
Chuck Berry
Bez
Gordon Banks
Bing Ji Ling
Bilal
Diane Birch
Aloe Blacc
Bobby Bland
Beyoncé
Mary J. Blige
Bob & Earl
Gary U.S. Bonds
Booker T. & the MG's
Larry Braggs
Charles Bradley
Brandy
Tamar Braxton
Toni Braxton
Marc Broussard
Barbara Brown
Divine Brown
James Brown
Maxine Brown
Nappy Brown
Ruth Brown
Shirley Brown
Peabo Bryson
Solomon Burke
Billy Butler
Jerry Butler
Bobby Byrd

C
Roy C
Mariah Carey
Carl Carlton
James Carr
Clarence Carter
The Chambers Brothers
Gene Chandler
Ray Charles
Chubby Checker
Cody ChesnuTT
Chic
The Chiffons
The Chi-Lites
Otis Clay
Willie Clayton
George Clinton
Joe Cocker
Natalie Cole
Mitty Collier
William "Bootsy" Collins
The Commodores
Arthur Conley
Sarah Connor
The Contours
Sam Cooke
Don Covay
Deborah Cox
Jonny Craig
Robert Cray
Darren Criss
The Crystals
Tracy Chapman

D
D'Angelo
Terence Trent D'Arby
Tyrone Davis
DeBarge
The Delfonics
The Dells
Delvon Lamarr Organ Trio
Joy Denalane
Sugar Pie DeSanto
Des'ree
Destiny's Child
The Detroit Emeralds
William DeVaughn
Jim Diamond
Bo Diddley
Fats Domino
Melinda Doolittle
Lee Dorsey
The Dramatics
The Drifters
Dru Hill
Duffy
Doris Duke
Dwele
Dyke and the Blazers

E
Earth, Wind & Fire
Anderson East
Eddie & Ernie
The Elgins
Lorraine Ellison
The Emotions
Estelle
Eye Alaska
Faith Evans
Niki Evans
Terry Evans
Ella Fitzgerald

F
Yvonne Fair
Paloma Faith
Fantasia
Rebecca Ferguson
Melanie Fiona
Roberta Flack
The Floaters
Floetry
Eddie Floyd
King Floyd
The Foundations
The Four Tops
Inez and Charlie Foxx
Aretha Franklin
Carolyn Franklin
Erma Franklin
The Funk Brothers

G
Marvin Gaye
Gem Tang
Johnny Gill
Candice Glover
Gnarls Barkley
James Govan
Dobie Gray
Macy Gray
Al Green
CeeLo Green
Skylar Grey
Christina Grimmie
Guy
Gwen Guthrie

H
Lynden David Hall
Anthony Hamilton
Betty Harris
Wynonie Harris
Kree Harrison
Donny Hathaway
Isaac Hayes
Heather Headley
Bobby Hebb
Hi Rhythm Section
Taylor Hicks
Lauryn Hill
Brenda Holloway
Loleatta Holloway
Thelma Houston
Whitney Houston
Jennifer Hudson
Jimmy Hughes
Tommy Hunt
Willie Hutch
Phyllis Hyman
Hands Like Houses
Billie Holiday
Hozier
Ivory Joe Hunter

I
The Impressions
Luther Ingram
The Ink Spots
The Isley Brothers
The Main Ingredient

J
Jacob Banks
The Jackson 5
Al Jackson, Jr.
Chuck Jackson
Freddie Jackson
George Jackson
Janet Jackson
Jermaine Jackson
J.J. Jackson
Mahalia Jackson
Michael Jackson
Millie Jackson
Jacksoul
The Jaggerz
Jaibi
Etta James
Leela James
Rick James
Miles Jaye
Jaguar Wright
The JB's
Jessica Sanchez
Joshua Ledet
Jessie J
Jessie Ware
Jodeci
JoJo
Joe
Little Willie John
L.V. Johnson
Lou Johnson
Mable John
Nick Jonas
Ruby Johnson
Syl Johnson
Syleena Johnson
Tom Jones
Booker T. Jones
Gloria Jones
Linda Jones
Sharon Jones
Thelma Jones
Louis Jordan
JP Cooper

K
Eddie Kendricks
Kehlani
Alicia Keys
Khalid
Chaka Khan
Kindred the Family Soul
Theola Kilgore
Ben E. King
Carole King
King Curtis
Michael Kiwanuka
Beverley Knight
The Knight Brothers
Frederick Knight
Gladys Knight & the Pips
Jean Knight
Lenny Kravitz
Kyla

L
Lee Fields
Lianne La Havas
Labelle
Patti LaBelle
Steve Lacy
Major Lance
Amel Larrieux
Denise LaSalle
Latimore
Bettye LaVette
Ledisi
Amos Lee
Laura Lee
John Legend
Ravyn Lenae
Ari Lennox
Lemar
Barbara Lewis
Leona Lewis
Ramsey Lewis
Little Anthony and the Imperials
Little Milton
Little Richard
Mary Love
Barbara Lynn
Cheryl Lynn
Maysa Leak

M
Veronica Maggio
Maher Zain
Sananda Maitreya
The Mar-Keys
Teena Marie
Bruno Mars
Kristi Martel
Martha & the Vandellas
The Marvelettes
Johnny Mathis
Jessica Mauboy
John Mayer
Maxwell
Mýa
Curtis Mayfield
Toussaint McCall
George McCrae
Gwen McCrae
Michael McDonald
Kevin McHale
Clyde McPhatter
Mel and Tim
Harold Melvin & the Blue Notes
The Memphis Horns
The Meters
Chrisette Michele
Angie Miller
Stephanie Mills
Garnet Mimms
The Miracles
Jackie Mittoo
Janelle Monáe
Monica
Dorothy Moore
Jackie Moore
Teedra Moses
Musiq Soulchild
Muscle Shoals Rhythm Section
Michael Bublé

N
Xavier Naidoo
Aaron Neville
The Neville Brothers
John Newman
Ne-Yo
Nneka
Nick Jonas & the Administration
Nikolai Noskov
Nina (Soul Siren)
Laura Nyro

O
The O'Jays
Billy Ocean
Frank Ocean
The Ohio Players
Ollie and the Nightingales
Omawumi

P
The Parliaments
Billy Paul
 Paulini
Freda Payne
Peaches & Herb
Ann Peebles
Teddy Pendergrass
George Perkins
The Persuaders
Esther Phillips
Wilson Pickett
Plan B
The Pointer Sisters
The Platters
Elvis Presley
Billy Preston
Kelly Price
Lloyd Price
Billy Price
Prince
James & Bobby Purify

R
Corinne Bailey Rae
Bonnie Raitt
Jaya Ramsey
Lou Rawls
Otis Redding
Della Reese
Martha & The Vandellas
Haley Reinhart
Wendy Rene
Mack Rice
Lionel Richie
The Righteous Brothers
Minnie Riperton
Eric Roberson
Smokey Robinson
Tad Robinson
Nile Rodgers
The Ronettes
Rose Royce
Diana Ross
David Ruffin
Rufus
Mitch Ryder & the Detroit Wheels
Rag'n'Bone Man

S
Sade
Sam & Dave
Curtis Salgado
Nicole Scherzinger
Freddie Scott
Gil Scott-Heron
Jill Scott
Seal
Reggie Sears
Guy Sebastian
Seohyun
Ann Sexton
Remy Shand
Shanty
The Shirelles
Juliet Simms
Joe Simon
Nina Simone 
Valerie Simpson
Percy Sledge
Sly & the Family Stone
Jorja Smith
O.C. Smith
Sam Smith
The Soul Children
Soul Rebels Brass Band
Soul Basement
Jordin Sparks
The Spinners
Dusty Springfield
The Staple Singers
Lisa Stansfield
Mavis Staples
Edwin Starr
St. Paul & The Broken Bones
Candi Staton
Chris Stapleton
Allen Stone
Angie Stone
Joss Stone
Sylvia Striplin
Barrett Strong
Patrick Stump
The Stylistics
Donna Summer
The Supremes
Bettye Swann
Keith Sweat
The Sweet Inspirations

T
Tim Maia
Taeyeon
Tamia
The Tams
Howard Tate
Tavares
Bobby Taylor & the Vancouvers
Debbie Taylor
Gary Taylor
Johnnie Taylor
Little Johnny Taylor
Ted Taylor
Rod Temperton
The Temptations
Tammi Terrell
Joe Tex
Robin Thicke
Carla Thomas
Irma Thomas
Rufus Thomas
Timmy Thomas
Ural Thomas
Melody Thornton
Justin Timberlake
Allen Toussaint
Tower of Power
Roger Troutman
Doris Troy
Sam Tsui
Ike Turner
Tina Turner
Tweet
Tori Kelly
The Weeknd
Tsumyoki

U
The Undisputed Truth
Usher

V
Luther Vandross
Sarah Vaughan
The Velvelettes
Billy Vera

W
Waii
Summer Walker
Terri Walker
Jr. Walker & the All Stars
War
Dee Dee Warwick
Dionne Warwick
Dinah Washington
Ella Washington
Justine "Baby" Washington
Grover Washington, Jr.
Keith Washington
Johnny "Guitar" Watson
Jean Wells
Mary Wells
Fred Wesley
Kim Weston
The Whispers
Barry White
Marva Whitney
Deniece Williams
Chuck Willis
Nicole Willis
Jackie Wilson
Amy Winehouse
Bill Withers
Bobby Womack
Stevie Wonder
Brenton Wood
Sam Woolf
Betty Wright
O.V. Wright

Y
Tommie Young
Timi Yuro
Yuvan Shankar Raja

References

Sources

Soul